Lal Kumar (Urdu: لال کمار, Sindhi لال ڪمار born 25 October 1987, in Mithi)  is a Pakistani cricketer who has played first-class cricket for the Hyderabad cricket team (Pakistan), Hyderabad Hawks, and the Rest of Pakistan Under-19's.

He is a left-hand batsman and a left-arm pace bowler, Kumar has scored 319 runs (average of 22.78) and taken 31 wickets (average of 24.83) in 9 first-class games. His highest score is 63 runs, and his best bowling figures in a match were 8 wickets for 135 runs. He was also part of the bronze medal-winning Pakistan team at the 2010 Asian Games.

In February 2021, he began to undertake coaching courses with the Pakistan Cricket Board.

References

External links
 Cricinfo Profile 
 Cricketarchive Profile

1989 births
Living people
Pakistani Hindus
People from Tharparkar District
Pakistani cricketers
Sindh cricketers
Hyderabad (Pakistan) cricketers
Lankan Cricket Club cricketers
Cricketers at the 2010 Asian Games
Asian Games medalists in cricket
Asian Games bronze medalists for Pakistan
Medalists at the 2010 Asian Games
Thari people